SS Frank Flowers was a Liberty ship built in the United States during World War II. She was named after Frank Flowers, a veteran of the Spanish–American War, he served aboard , in the supply department, during WWI, and later served as steward and purser with the United States Lines.

Construction
Frank Flowers was laid down on 9 May 1945, under a Maritime Commission (MARCOM) contract, MC hull 3141, by J.A. Jones Construction, Panama City, Florida; she was launched on 22 June 1945.

History
She was allocated to American Export Lines, on 16 July 1945. On 26 October 1945, she was laid up in the Hudson River Reserve Fleet, Jones Point, New York, 26 October 1945. On 21 August 1953, she was placed in the, Beaumont Reserve Fleet, Beaumont, Texas. She was sold for scrapping, 15 July 1974, to Luria Brothers and Co., Inc., for $191,889.98. She was removed from the fleet, 5 August 1974.

References

Bibliography

 
 
 
 
 

 

Liberty ships
Ships built in Panama City, Florida
1945 ships
James River Reserve Fleet
Beaumont Reserve Fleet